Restroom may refer to:

 Public toilet, in a public space
 Toilet (room), in a private residence